The Cuban pewee or crescent-eyed pewee (Contopus caribaeus) is a species of bird in the family Tyrannidae. It is found in Cuba and the northern Bahamas. It was formerly lumped with the Hispaniolan pewee (C. hispaniolensis) and Jamaican pewee  (C. pallidus) as a single species, the Greater Antillean pewee.

This small flycatcher measures . It is dark olive-grey above and dark grey to buff below. In place of an eyering, it has a white crescent-shaped marking directly behind the eye. The broad, flat bill is bicolored, with a yellow lower mandible.

Its distinctive call is a long, descending whistle.

Its natural habitats are subtropical or tropical dry forest, subtropical or tropical moist lowland forest, subtropical or tropical moist montane forest, and heavily degraded former forest.

The nest is small and cup-shaped. Up to 4 eggs are laid between March and June. The eggs are white with heavy dark spotting at the large end.

References

External links

 
 
 
 
 
 
 

Cuban pewee
Birds of the Bahamas
Birds of Cuba
Cuban pewee
Taxonomy articles created by Polbot